HM Prison Kirkham is a Category D men's prison, located southwest of Kirkham in Lancashire, England. The prison is operated by His Majesty's Prison Service.

History

RAF Kirkham
Work commenced in 1939 and the camp opened in 1940 as a training camp for RAF tradesmen. Up to 1945 it trained 72,000 British and allied service men and women. In November 1941 Kirkham became the main armament training centre for the RAF, with 21 different trades and 86 different courses on equipment and weapons. Pupils came not only from the Commonwealth of Nations, but the United States, the Netherlands, Poland, France, Norway, Czechoslovakia and Belgium. Kirkham had ten hangars as well as its own cinema and hospital. From May to December 1945 Kirkham became a demob centre. After the war it trained RAF boy entrants until December 1957 when it closed.

Kirkham Prison
In the early 1960s part of the facility was taken over by the Home Office with HMP Kirkham opening in 1962 as an open prison. The rest of the land lay derelict, but is now used for agricultural purposes and a nature reserve. Today most of the infrastructure, services and buildings of the prison are still of World War II vintage, though prisoner accommodation is located in more modern buildings.

In June 2003 it emerged that Kirkham Prison had seen more prisoners abscond than any other open prison in England and Wales. Statistics showed that 911 inmates had absconded from 1998 to 2003.

In January 2004 Kirkham became the first prison in England (along with HMP Morton Hall) to trial the Intermittent Custody Scheme. The scheme saw some inmates held at Kirkham from Monday to Friday (released at weekends), while another set of prisoners were held on Saturdays and Sundays (released during the week). The scheme was designed to allow prisoners on short sentences to remain in employment, independent housing and maintain family ties during their jail terms. The scheme was subsequently abandoned in November 2006.

In August 2004 the Prison Reform Trust issued statistics revealing that Kirkham had the worst record for inmate drug use of all prisons in England. A survey of drug tests at the prison showed that 35% of inmates tested positive for controlled substances.

In 2011 inmates were involved in a scheme to restore Blackpool trams on behalf of the Friends of Fleetwood Trams.

The prison today

Kirkham is an open men's prison, and holds Category D prisoners who can reasonably be trusted to serve their sentence in open conditions. Kirkham provides morning and afternoon education provided by The Manchester College. Offenders are also employed in the prison's kitchen, workshops, farms and gardens and works departments.

The full operational capacity is 630. There are 24 dormitories (or billets), of varying size, each with its own telephone. There are 572 single rooms, each with its own key. Nine of the rooms are double occupancy. All rooms have television access and three of the dormitories have personal en-suite facilities including showers. There are limited disabled facilities with wheelchair access.

In 2012 the prison celebrated its 50th anniversary.

Notable former inmates
 George Reynolds
 Ian Brown
 Simon Garner
 Jan Mølby

References

External links
 Ministry of Justice pages on Kirkham

Kirkham
Kirkham
Buildings and structures in the Borough of Fylde
1962 establishments in England
Kirkham